Kopacz - is a Polish coat of arms. It was used by several szlachta families in the times of the Kingdom of Poland and Polish–Lithuanian Commonwealth.

Blazon

Notable bearers
Notable bearers of this coat of arms include:

Gallery

See also
 Polish heraldry
 Heraldic family
 List of Polish nobility coats of arms

External links

Bibliography
 Tadeusz Gajl: Herbarz polski od średniowiecza do XX wieku: ponad 4500 herbów szlacheckich 37 tysięcy nazwisk 55 tysięcy rodów. L&L, 2007, s. 406-539. .

Polish coats of arms